Nunzio may refer to:

 A masculine Italian name.
 James Maritato (born 1972), who has used it as his ring name.

People 
Other people with the name include:

 Gregory Corso, AKA Gregory Nunzio Corso (1930–2001), a Beat poet
 Nunzio DeFilippis, American writer of comic books and television
 Nick Discepola (born 1949), Italian-born Canadian politician whose given name is Nunzio
 Nunzio Ferraiuoli (1661–1735), Italian painter of the Baroque period
 Nunzio Gallo (1928–2008), Italian singer and actor
 Joseph Nunzio Latino (1937–2021), Roman Catholic Bishop of Jackson (Mississippi, US, 2003–2013)
 Nunzio Provenzano (1923–1997), Genovese crime family soldier

Fiction 

 Nunzio, a character in the Myth Adventures series created by Robert Asprin
 Sacred Silence, an Italian film originally titled Pianese Nunzio, 14 anni a maggio
 Nunzio (film), a 1978 American film starring David Proval

Italian masculine given names